Ferdinando I, re di Napoli is a 1959 Italian comedy film directed by Gianni Franciolini.

Plot
Naples, 1806. The king Ferdinand I of the Two Sicilies is frowned upon by the people, especially the comic theatrical Pulcinella, which continually delivers hard sermons, earning a reputation among the Neapolitans. Ferdinand one day gets angry and does condemn to death Pulcinella, while every night the king  masquerades himself as populate with a false name, having fun in the taverns. Pulcinella unmasks him and invokes the rebellion of the people of Naples, that never comes. However, the cruelty of Ferdinand stops when Napoleon Bonaparte arrives in Italy. While the Neapolitans celebrate (false) freedom, Ferdinand makes a noble disguise his coachman while he wears populate dresses, and runs away from the city.

Cast
 Peppino De Filippo - Ferdinand I.
 Eduardo De Filippo - Pulcinella
 Titina De Filippo - Titina
 Vittorio De Sica - Seccano
 Aldo Fabrizi - A peasant
 Marcello Mastroianni - Gennarino
 Leslie Phillips - Pat
 Renato Rascel - Mimi
 Jacqueline Sassard - Cordelia
 Rosanna Schiaffino - Nannina
 Nino Taranto - Tarantella
 Memmo Carotenuto
 Pietro De Vico
 Giacomo Furia
 Nino Vingelli

References

External links

1959 films
1950s Italian-language films
1959 comedy films
Italian black-and-white films
Films directed by Gianni Franciolini
Films set in Naples
Italian comedy films
1950s Italian films